Arthur Eyguem De Montaigne Jarvis (30 November 1894 - 20 January 1969) was a Canadian World War I flying ace credited with 5 victories.

Text of citations

Distinguished Flying Cross

"Lieut. Arthur Eyguem de Montaingne Jarvis (E. Ontario R.).
A bold and determined fighter. On the 26th of July he engaged and shot down an enemy machine, which was seen to crash. Later on the same date he attacked a hostile two-seater and forced it to land near our lines; both occupants were taken prisoners."

References

Canadian aviators
Canadian World War I flying aces
1894 births
1969 deaths